Dean McRae (born 12 November 1968) is a former Australian rules footballer who played with North Melbourne and the Sydney Swans in the Victorian/Australian Football League (VFL/AFL).

At the time of his arrival at the club, McRae was a Queenslander, recruited to North Melbourne from Sandgate. His family had moved to Bribie Island from Victoria in the late 1980s.  He played in six seasons for North Melbourne.

In the 1992 National Draft, North Melbourne traded McRae to Sydney, in return for the 110th selection of the draft, which they used to redraft Jeff Chandler.

He averaged 16 disposals a game from his 18 appearances for the Swans in 1993. After another solid season in 1994, McRae was the fifth leading disposal getter at the club in 1995. He lost his place in the Sydney team early in the 1996 season and took no further part in their run to the grand final, where they would be defeated by McRae's former club.

References

1968 births
Australian rules footballers from Queensland
North Melbourne Football Club players
Sydney Swans players
Sandgate Football Club players
Living people